Six Litanies for Heliogabalus is an album by John Zorn. It is the third album to feature the "Moonchild Trio" of Mike Patton, Joey Baron and Trevor Dunn, following Moonchild: Songs Without Words (2005) and Astronome (2006) and the first to feature additional performers. The promotional notes that accompany the US CD Release indicate that the concept for the recording was inspired by the Roman Emperor Heliogabalus.

Track listing

All compositions by John Zorn

Personnel
John Zorn – alto sax, composer, conductor 
Joey Baron – drums 
Trevor Dunn – bass 
Ikue Mori – electronics 
Mike Patton – voice 
Jamie Saft – organ 
Martha Cluver – voice 
Abby Fischer – voice 
Kirsten Sollek – voice

References

2007 albums
Moonchild albums
Albums produced by John Zorn
Tzadik Records albums
Cultural depictions of Elagabalus